This is a list of notable converts to Christianity from pagan religions. Paganism is a term which, from a Western perspective, has come to connote a broad set of spiritual or cultic  practices or beliefs of any folk religion, and of historical and contemporary polytheistic religions in particular.

While the term has historically been used to denote adherents of any non-Abrahamic faith, for the purposes of this list, only adherents of non-major polytheistic, shamanistic, pantheistic, or animistic religions will be listed in this section.

British Isles/Celtic/Germanic (excluding Norse) paganism
 Aebbe the Elder – Scottish monastic founder.
 Saint Alban – first Christian martyr in Britain.
 Cenwalh of Wessex - King of Wessex.
 Constantine of Cornwall - 6th-century king of Dumnonia.
 Saint Constantine of Strathclyde – King of Strathclyde, and later abbot of Rahan.
 Óengus mac Nad Froích - 5th century King of Munster
 Cynegils - Anglo-Saxon king of the West Saxons.
 Raedwald of East Anglia – King of East Anglia from about AD 599 to about AD 625.
 Sigeberht of East Anglia - King of East Anglia from AD 631 to 634.
 Riderch Hael - King of Strathclyde who established the first See of Strathclyde at Glasgow.
 Æthelberht of Kent – King of Kent.
 Clovis I - early king of the Franks.
Igraine - mother of King Arthur
 Peada of Mercia - King of southern Mercia; helped found the monastery at Peterborough.
 Leonard of Noblac – Frankish noble in the court of Clovis I.
 Edwin of Northumbria - King of Deira and Bernicia.
 Rumwold - legendary "infant saint".
 Saint Bavo – Frankish eremitic monk who lived during the Middle Ages.

Norse paganism

 Leif Ericson – Icelandic Viking explorer.
 Guthrum of East Anglia - King of the Danish Vikings in the Danelaw.
 Rollo of Normandy – founder of Viking province of Normandy.
 Saint Olaf – King of Norway.
 Rorik of Dorestad – Danish Viking leader.

Graeco-Roman Paganism
 Saint Apollonius – 2nd-century Roman Senator, Christian apologist and martyr.
 Coelia Concordia – last Roman Vestal Virgin.
 Commodianus - Latin poet; first practiced Judaism, and later converted to Christianity.
 Constantine I (the Great) – Roman Emperor who legalized Christianity in the Edict of Milan in 313.
 Pertinax of Byzantium – Bishop of Byzantium from 169 until his death in 187.
 Athenagoras of Athens – philosopher and early Christian apologist.
 Dionysius the Pseudo-Areopagite – judge of the Areopagus and early Bishop of Athens.
 Saint Eustace – early Christian who was martyred, with his family, in a brazen bull.
 Evodius - early Bishop of Antioch who (according to tradition) first called the disciples of Christ "Christians".
 Gaius Marius Victorinus – Roman philosopher.
 Honoratus - former Archbishop of Arles.
 Pancras of Rome – early Roman Christian martyr.
 Saint Pantaleon (Panteleimon) – early Christian physician and martyr.
 Saint Cyriacus – early Christian saint.
 Saint Julius the Veteran – early Christian martyr.
 Sabinian of Troyes – Christian martyr.
 Tertullian - author and apologist; coined the Latin term for 'Trinity.'
 Lactantius - early Christian author.
 Theophilus of Antioch - early Patriarch of Antioch.
 Justin Martyr – early Christian apologist.
 Polycarp - early Christian bishop.

Egyptian paganism
 Horapollo - leader of the few remaining pagan schools of Menouthis during Emperor Zeno's reign (474-491) who converted to Christianity after being tortured.

Mideastern and Arabian paganism
Waraqah ibn Nawfal - Parental cousin of Khadija,  Muhammad's first wife.
 Rabbula - early Bishop of Edessa.

African traditional religions
 Charles Atangana – paramount chief of the Ewondo and Bane ethnic groups in Cameroon; first Ewondo to be baptised.
 Francis Arinze - Nigerian Roman Catholic cardinal.
 Félix Houphouët-Boigny - first President of Côte d'Ivoire.
 Frederick William Koko Mingi VIII of Nembe - 19th-century king of Nembe who later returned to animism
 Samuel Ajayi Crowther – first African Anglican bishop in Nigeria.
 Jomo Kenyatta – first Prime Minister and President of Kenya.
 Bernard Mizeki – African Christian missionary and martyr.
 Nzinga of Ndongo and Matamba - Queen of Ndongo and Matamba in the 16th century.
 Ranavalona II – Queen of Madagascar.
 Joseph Shabalala – lead singer, founder and musical director of Ladysmith Black Mambazo.

North American or Inuit
 Gelelemend - prominent Lenape convert to the Moravian Church.
 Geronimo - leader of the Bedonkohe Apache.
 Samson Occom – Mohegan minister.
 Pocahontas - Native American celebrity in 17th century London.
 Helen Kalvak - Inuit artist from Ulukhaktok, Northwest Territories, Canada.
 Kateri Tekakwitha - Native American who became a Roman Catholic saint.
 Red Cloud - Oglala military leader during the Bozeman War.
 Chief Seattle - Suquamish and Duwamish leader and namesake of Seattle, Washington.

New Zealand and Pacific Islands traditional religions
 Hone Heke – Māori rangatira (chief) of the Ngāpuhi iwi (tribe) of Aotearoa New Zealand.
 Tāmati Wāka Nene – Māori rangatira (chief) of the Ngāpuhi iwi (tribe) of Aotearoa New Zealand who fought as an ally of the British in the Flagstaff War.
 Tārore - Māori daughter of chief Wiremu Ngākuku. Murdered by Paora Te Uita in the Kiamai Ranges, 18 Oct 1836 at the age of 12.
 Wiremu Ngākuku - Māori rangatira (chief) of the Ngāti Hauā iwi (tribe) of Aotearoa New Zealand refused to take utu (revenge) for his daughter Tārore's murder.
 Paora Te Uita - Ngāti Whakaue warrior and murderer of Tārore, converted to Christianity after hearing a reading from Tārore's Gospel of Luke that he had stolen from her.
 Tāmihana Te Rauparaha - son of chief Te Rauparaha, influential convert to Christianity and early, but temporary, champion of the Māori King Movement.
 Wiremu Tāmihana - Māori leader of the Ngāti Hauā iwi (tribe) of Aotearoa New Zealand. Known as the kingmaker for his role in the Māori King Movement.
 Āpihai Te Kawau - Māori paramount chief of the Ngāti Whātua iwi (tribe) responsible for gifting the land to build the city of Auckland.
 Piripi Taumata-a-Kura - notable Māori evangelist of Ngati Porou iwi (tribe) descent.
 Queen Kaahumanu – Hawaiian monarch, wife of Kamehameha I.
 Queen ʻAimata Pōmare – Tahitian monarch.
 Riro Kāinga – Rapa Nui chief and last King of Easter Island.
 María Angata – Rapa Nui catechist who led an unsuccessful rebellion against the Williamson-Balfour Company.

European paganism (generic)
 Saint Barbara - Orthodox Christian martyr.

Eastern European/ Slavic paganism
 Borivoj I of Bohemia – Duke of Bohemia (852/853 – 888/889).
 Boris I of Bulgaria – Bulgarian ruler and monk.
Anna, daughter of Presian I - sister of Boris I.
 Saint Ludmila – Catholic and Orthodox Christian saint and martyr.
 Mieszko I of Poland - first Prince of Poland (962-992)
 Sittas - Byzantine magister militum.
 Vladimir I of Kiev – Grand Prince of Kiev., the Baptiser of Russian Lands, Equal to Apostles

Baltic paganism
 Mindaugas - the first and only Christian king of Lithuania, accepted Christianity in 1251.
 Morta – Queen of Lithuania and wife of Mindaugas. She remained a Christian even after the apostasy of her husband.
 Jogaila - former King of Poland and Grand Duke of Lithuania.
 Vytautas The Great – the Grand Duke of Lithuania and cousin of Jogaila.

Finnic paganism
Caupo of Turaida, leader of Livonians

References

 
C